Diana Francesca Caroline Clare Barran, Baroness Barran,  (born 10 February 1959) is a British charity campaigner, former hedge fund manager and Conservative Party life peer. She is the founder of the domestic abuse awareness charity SafeLives and served as its chief executive from 2004 to 2017.

Career
Barran worked as an investment banker in London and Paris for Morgan Grenfell and Enskilda Asset Management and founded the hedge fund Barran and Partners in 1993. Barran left Beaumont Capital in 2001 shortly before its sale to Schroders. Barran owned 10% of Beaumont Capital at the time of her departure.

Barran is a former trustee of Comic Relief and a former chair of the Henry Smith Charity. Barran has worked as the head of grant development for New Philanthropy Capital and as the firms donor adviser.

On 26 July 2019, Barran was appointed Parliamentary Under-Secretary of State for Civil Society at the Department for Culture, Media and Sport in the first Johnson ministry. The role included responsibility for the department's business in the Lords and First World War commemorations.

Barran assumed the "loneliness porfolio" in 2019, taking on the role of "Minister of Loneliness" that former Prime Minister Theresa May established in 2018, which had previously been held by Tracey Crouch and Mims Davies.  The position aimed to address the crisis of loneliness in British society that a 2017 commission initiated by Jo Cox had investigated.According to the British Red Cross, more than 9 million people in the UK feel lonely. 

On 17 September 2021, Barran was appointed Parliamentary Under-Secretary of State for the School System at the Department for Education, in the second cabinet reshuffle of the second Johnson ministry. She was reappointed to this position by Liz Truss. She was reappointed by Rishi Sunak but the portfolio changed to Parliamentary Under-Secretary of State for the School System and Student Finance.

Personal life
Barran is married with four children. She was educated at Benenden School and King's College, Cambridge.

Honours and awards

In the 2011 Birthday Honours, Barran was appointed a Member of the Order of the British Empire (MBE).

In May 2018, it was announced that she will be conferred a life peerage. On 21 June, she was created Baroness Barran, of Bathwick in the City of Bath.

Barran was on the list of the BBC's 100 Women announced on 23 November 2020.

Notelist

References

External links

Living people
Alumni of King's College, Cambridge
British charity and campaign group workers
British hedge fund managers
English financial businesspeople
British investment bankers
Conservative Party (UK) life peers
Life peers created by Elizabeth II
Domestic violence awareness
Members of the Order of the British Empire
1959 births
BBC 100 Women